Carlos Lemos (11 June 1909 - 22 February 1988) was a Spanish theatre and film actor. He appeared in more than thirty films from 1953 to 1987.

Selected filmography

References

External links 

1909 births
1988 deaths
Spanish male film actors
Spanish male stage actors